Jamaican Canadians are Canadian citizens of Jamaican descent or Jamaican-born permanent residents of Canada. The population, according to Canada's 2016 Census, is 309,485. Jamaican Canadians comprise about 30% of the entire Black Canadian population.

History
Most Jamaicans who arrive in Canada settle in the census metropolitan areas of Toronto, Montreal, Ottawa and Hamilton. The total number of Jamaicans in Canada has increased since the 1960s. Currently, Jamaicans can be found in every major Canadian city and occupy a multitude of occupations.

Origins
The first Jamaicans who moved to Canada were West Indian slaves imported into New France and Nova Scotia individually and in small numbers. In 1796, the Maroons of Jamaica entered Halifax and were the first large group to enter British North America (The Canadian Encyclopedia, 2000). The name Maroons was used to describe slaves who ran away from their owners and created free communities away from the European settlements in Jamaica. A war between the Maroons and the British broke out on the island of Jamaica in 1795. The war ended when the British, realizing that victory could not be achieved, tricked the Maroons into laying down their arms and then carried them into exile in Nova Scotia (James & Walker, 1984).

Governor John Wentworth settled the Maroons, who numbered over 500, on the outskirts of Halifax and offered the men jobs to fortify the Citadel. The Maroons mounted a resistance. After numerous appeals to London, the Maroons were allowed to return to Sierra Leone in West Africa in 1800. The "Maroon Bastion" stands on Citadel Hill as an example of their legacy and the sense of pride they contributed (James & Walker, 1984).

Between 1800 and 1920, small numbers of West Indians were brought from Jamaica as labourers for the Cape Breton mines and from Barbados to work in coal mines in Sydney and Nova Scotia. Migration from the West Indies decreased after 1920. Even though pressure for migration in the West Indies mounted, the Canadian government refused to allow any more "non-whites" into the country (James & Walker, 1984).

In 1908, Robert Borden, the leader of the Conservative Party, stated "The Conservative Party stands for a white Canada". The Liberal government passed immigration that excluded non-whites unless immigrants participated in manual labour (James & Walker, 1984).

Agnes Macdonald, the second wife of the first Prime Minister of Canada, John A. Macdonald, was born in Jamaica. Her brother, Hewitt Bernard, was the recording secretary at the Charlottetown Conference in 1864. After Confederation, Bernard served as the private secretary to the Prime Minister between 1867 and 1873.

Michael Manley, the future Prime Minister of Jamaica, served in the Royal Canadian Air Force during World War II.

After World War II
After World War II, a great demand for unskilled workers resulted in the National Act of 1948. This Act was designed to attract cheap laborers from British colonies. This resulted in many West Indians, (including Jamaicans) coming to Canada. Wanting to stop the in-flow of black West Indians, the Walter Act of 1952 was passed to impose a "severely restricted quota" on black West Indians entering the country (James & Walker, 1984).

In 1955, Canada introduced the West Indian Domestic Scheme (Anderson, 1993). This Scheme allowed eligible black women who were between the age of 18 to 35, in good health, no family ties and a minimum of a grade eight education from mainly Jamaica and Barbados to enter Canada (James & Walker, 1984). After one year as a domestic servant, these women were given a landed immigrant status and were able to apply for citizenship after five years. Even though the Scheme originally allowed only 100 women per year, 2,690 women entered Canada from Jamaica and Barbados by 1965. In 1962, racial discrimination was taken out of the Canadian Immigration Act and the number of Jamaicans who moved to Canada increased (Lazar & Dauglas, 1992).

After the 1960s
Because changes in the Immigration Act allowed non-whites to enter Canada without restrictions, many Jamaicans took advantage of the opportunity and entered Canada. After the purging of many racist immigration policies, a large number of Jamaicans started to enter Canada as tourists and many would later apply independently for landed immigrant status (Anderson, 1993). In the late 1960s, the Canadian government instituted the Family Reunification clause into its immigration policy, which made it easier for Jamaicans and other groups to bring their families to join them in Canada. (Anderson, 1993). Thus, during the 1970s and '80s, many Jamaicans who entered Canada were children and husbands of the Jamaican women who moved to Canada between 1955 and 1965. According to Anderson (1993), Caribbean immigrants to Canada were more likely to settle in large cities and their provinces of choice were Ontario and Quebec. The largest concentration of Jamaican immigrants can be found in the following areas of Greater Toronto: Scarborough, Old Toronto, North York, York, Ajax, Pickering, Mississauga and Brampton. Other cities include Montreal, Ottawa, Edmonton, Vancouver, Winnipeg, Kitchener, Waterloo, Windsor and Halifax (The Canadian Encyclopedia, 2000).

In 1989, 86.7% of Jamaican immigrants settled in Ontario, 7.4% settled in Quebec, 2.6% settled in Alberta, 1.7% settled in Manitoba, 1.1% settled in British Columbia and 0.6% settled in the rest of Canada. Jamaicans made up 27.5% of the total number of West Indian immigrants for that year (Anderson, 1993).

Demography

The majority of West Indians immigrating to Canada are Jamaican. Between 1974 and 1989, 35.7% of all West Indian immigration to Canada came from Jamaica. Nevertheless, there was a decline during the early '80s, a recovery during 1986 and a decline again by 1989 (Anderson, 1993). According to the Canadian Encyclopedia, Jamaicans made up 40% of West Indian immigration in the early 1990s.

In a 1996 overview from Immigration Canada, Jamaica was ranked eighth in terms of the number of its citizens immigrating to Canada. Jamaica is preceded by countries such as China, Pakistan and the Philippines in the number of its citizens that migrate to Canada. The number of Jamaicans immigrating to Canada declined in 1997 and again in 1998. Jamaican immigration to Canada is at an all-time low; it was ranked number 10 by Immigration Canada in 2000.

In 2006, 79,850 Jamaican Canadians lived in the City of Toronto, and 30,705 lived in the Toronto suburb of Brampton.

According to the Ministère des Affaires Internationales, de L'Immigration et des Communautés Culturelles et la Ville de Montréal, in 1995 there were 7,345 Jamaicans living in Quebec. By 2011, the Jamaican population nearly doubled to 12,730. Between 1960 and 1970, 28% of immigrants in Quebec were Jamaicans, during 1971 to 1980 there was a sharp increase to 41%, there was a significant drop to 12% between 1981 and 1985 and between 1986 and 1991 the number went up to 20%.

One possible reason for this drop between 1982 and 1985 might have been the language law Bill 101. Bill 101, which was introduced by Quebec's separatist government on August 26, 1977, introduced tighter restrictions on the use of English and access to English schools. It became against the law to produce any commercial sign that was not exclusively in French and the law aimed to make French the language of the workplace (O’Malley & Bowman, 2001).

Of the total number of Jamaicans living in Quebec, 20% can speak French and 86% practice Christianity as their religion. One percent of the populations have no schooling, 13% have a primary education, 45% have high school education, 25% have a college education and 16% have a university education (Ministère des Affaires Internationales, de L’Immigration et des Communautés Culturelles et la Ville de Montréal, 1995).

Population
According to the 2006 Census, 231,110 Canadians identified themselves as Jamaican Canadian. In the 2011 Census, 256,915 Jamaican Canadians were counted, comprising an 11.2% increase since the previous census. A total population of 309,485 was tallied in the 2016 Census, an increase of 20.5%.

Jamaican Canadians by Canadian province or territory (2016)

Material culture

Food: includes ackee and saltfish, rice and peas, jerk chicken, fish and pork, curried goat, pepperpot soup, roasted yams, banana fritters, patties, salads, fruits and exotic desserts. Beverages include carrot juice, ginger beer, almost all kinds of fruit juices, coconut water and sorrel.

Arts and crafts: Creations in straw, clay, fabric, shell, wood and semi-precious stone are on display in most Jamaican homes. African, Indian, European and Arawak cultures influence Jamaicans Arts and Crafts. Depicting life and landscape, Jamaican paintings feature bright colours and bold lines. No Jamaican kitchen is complete without a dutchy (a cast iron pot). Dutchys come in different sizes and it is said that, "the blacker the dutchy, the sweeter it cooks".

Theater: From the 19th-century Ward Theater to innovative little theaters and thriving centers for drama in Kingston, Jamaicans like a broad range of theatrical treats. Plays depict a variety of Jamaican experiences.

Sports and games: One could argue that the national game is domino followed by ludy. Sports of choice include cricket, football (soccer), bicycle racing, water-sports, horse racing, rafting, and track and field. Among youth however, basketball and hockey are the most popular sports; Jamaican Canadians Tristan Thompson and Anthony Bennett play in the NBA and represent Canada internationally in FIBA, while PK Subban is playing for the Nashville Predator and was selected to Canada's Winter Olympic Team.

Notable Jamaican Canadians

See also
British Jamaica

References

External links

Jamaican Diaspora
Caribbean Netnews
Carib Weekly
Jamaicans in Canada

 
Caribbean Canadian
Jamaica